The 1928–29 Kansas Jayhawks men's basketball team represented the University of Kansas during the 1928–29 college men's basketball season. It was the Jayhawks' 31st season. The Jayhawks were coached by Phog Allen, who was in the 10th season of his second tenure and 12th overall. They played their home games at Hoch Auditorium. The Jayhawks finished 2–8 in the Big Six Conference and 3–15 overall. The Jayhawks' .167 win percentage remains the worst win percentage in program history and is tied with the 1899–1900 team for fewest wins, however, that team only played 7 games.

Roster
Tom Bishop
Forrest Cox
Leo Dodd
Robert Maney
George McCormick
Clarence McGuire
Francis Plumley
Floyd Ramsey
Russell Thomson

Schedule

References

Kansas Jayhawks men's basketball seasons
Kansas
Kansas
Kansas